Lengerich is a municipality in the Emsland district, in Lower Saxony, Germany. It is situated approximately 15 km east of Lingen.

Lengerich is the seat of the Samtgemeinde ("collective municipality") Lengerich.

People 
 Johannes Wübbe (born 1966), German Roman Catholic auxiliary bishop

References

Emsland